Dechen Shak-Dagsay is a modern musician of traditional Tibetan Buddhist mantras expressed in recent lyrical contexts.

Life 
Born in Kathmandu, Nepal in 1959, Shak-Dagsay and her family moved to Switzerland in 1963, where she has resided ever since. She is the daughter of the Dagsay Tulku Rinpoche. 

Shak-Dagsay describes herself as committed to "preserving Tibetan culture in the West", having studied and performed traditional Tibetan music and dance throughout her childhood and adolescence. She has performed songs from her albums Jewel and Day Tomorrow at Carnegie Hall in New York CIty for the Tibet House Benefit Concert. She has also performed at the Kee Club in Hong Kong. 

She is also the founder of the Dewa Che charity organization, which engages in social projects in Tibet.

Albums 

 Jewel (2012)
 Asian Jewel (2014)
 Day Tomorrow
 emaho – The Story of Arya Tara (2021) 

Shak-Dagsay is also featured on the Beyond albums with Tina Turner, Regula Curti, and Sawani Shende-Sathaye.

References

External links 
 Homepage

1959 births
Living people
People from Kathmandu
Nepalese emigrants to Switzerland
Swiss people of Tibetan descent
Tibetan-language singers
Tibetan Buddhists from Switzerland
20th-century Tibetan women singers
Performers of Buddhist music
20th-century Swiss women singers
21st-century Swiss women singers